Jocara suiferens is a species of snout moth in the genus Jocara. It was described by Harrison Gray Dyar Jr. in 1913, and is known from Peru.

References

Moths described in 1913
Jocara